"When the Swallows Come Back to Capistrano" is a song written by Leon René and first recorded by The Ink Spots featuring Bill Kenny in May 1940.  The Ink Spots' recording of the song reached No. 4 on the US charts.

Background
René wrote the song as a tribute to the annual springtime return of the cliff swallows to Mission San Juan Capistrano in Southern California. A glassed-off room in the mission was later designated in René's honor, and displays the upright piano on which he composed the tune, the reception desk from his office, several copies of the song's sheet music and other pieces of furniture, all donated by René's family.

Other 1940 recordings
Also in 1940, a recording by Glenn Miller reached No. 2 the same year. 
Other recordings were made at about the same time by Xavier Cugat and Gene Krupa.

Later recordings 
The song was later recorded by among many others including: 
Fred Waring
Guy Lombardo
Billy May
Pat Boone—whose version reached No. 80 on the Billboard Top 100 Chart in 1957. (The Billboard Hot 100 Chart was established on August 4, 1958 issue), as the B-side of "April Love"
The Five Satins
Elvis Presley
Michael Hurley

References

Songs about California
Songs about birds
1940 songs
The Ink Spots songs
Glenn Miller songs
Pat Boone songs
Songs written by Leon René